The Coupe de France de Cyclo-cross is a cyclo-cross racing series held annually in France since 1983. It is held over several races throughout France, usually starting in mid October and ending in mid December. The competition was reserved for French riders only until 2017.

Past winners

Men

Elite

Under-23

Women

References

Cycle races in France
Cyclo-cross races
Recurring sporting events established in 1983
1983 establishments in France